The Buzzy Bee is a popular toy in New Zealand. It resembles a bee with rotating wings that move and make a clicking noise while the toy is pulled along the ground. Possibly based on an earlier American concept, it was designed and first produced in Newton, Auckland in the 1930s, by Maurice Schlesinger. It became popular during the post-war baby boom. Its bright colours and clicking sound call are familiar to many New Zealanders, making it one of the most well-recognised items of Kiwiana.   Since this time however, the Buzzy Bee has branched out into various merchandise including books, puzzle and clothing.

Promotion
It received a good deal of free promotion with the visit of The Prince and Princess of Wales in 1983 with their infant son, Prince William of Wales, who played with a Buzzy Bee.

As an iconic New Zealand symbol, the Buzzy Bee caricature was used on the keel of NZL84, one of Emirates Team New Zealand's entrant yachts for the America's Cup held in Valencia, Spain, in 2007.

Adaptations
In June 2007, plans were unveiled for a Buzzy Bee stage show "Buzzy Bee's Big Day Out". The company behind the show also revealed that they'd made an animated show reel and were finalising details of a distribution deal, and that they hoped to begin work on an animated series for television.  

An animated TV show, Buzzy Bee and Friends, premiered on TV2 in 2009. 52 episodes were produced.

References

External links
 Buzzy Bee Toys

Products introduced in 1950
New Zealand culture
New Zealand design
1950s toys
Toy animals
Fictional bees